The Poet Laureate of Tennessee is the official state poet of the U.S. state of Tennessee. The position was established in 1971–1972 by an act of the General Assembly of the state of Tennessee.

List of Poets Laureate 
 Richard M. "Pek" Gunn, 1971/1972–1994
 Margaret Britton Vaughn, 1995–present

See also

 Poet laureate
 List of U.S. states' poets laureate
 United States Poet Laureate

References

External links
 Tennessee Poet Laureate at Library of Congress

 
American Poets Laureate